Chavis is a surname. Notable people with the surname include:

Ben Chavis (disambiguation), multiple people
Boozoo Chavis (1930–2001), American musician
John Chavis (–1838), American educator and minister
John Chavis (American football) (born 1956), American football coach
Kory Chavis (fl. 2005–2008), American wrestler
Michael Chavis (born 1995), American baseball player